Phu Nam Ron is a pass across the Tenasserim Hills on the border between Thailand and Myanmar, at an elevation of . The border checkpoint on the Thai side is in Ban Kao Subdistrict, Mueang Kanchanaburi District, Kanchanaburi Province.

Border posts 
Htee Khee is the name of the new town in the Tanintharyi Region on the Myanmar side of the border which is currently being developed. The Phu Nam Ron pass is expected to gain in importance if the planned Dawei deepwater port project goes ahead, which includes a highway and a railway line between Bangkok and that harbor.

The road on the Burmese side leads to Dawei via Sinbyudaing and Myitta; it has been recently been upgraded.

References

External links
Karen News - Border crossing goes legal 
Tenasserim Hills
Mountain passes of Thailand
Mountain passes of Myanmar
Myanmar–Thailand border crossings
Geography of Kanchanaburi province